Quetrequén is a village and rural locality (municipality) in the Rancul Department of La Pampa Province in Argentina.

References

Populated places in La Pampa Province